Vembukudi may refer to places in India:

 Vembukudi, Ariyalur, Tamil Nadu
 Vembukudi, Thanjavur, Tamil Nadu